Kirk Jarvinen (born 1967 in Detroit, Michigan) is an American artist / illustrator best known for his cartoon-style comic book art.

Early life
Kirk Jarvinen was born in 1967 in Detroit, and raised in Michigan.

Career
Jarvinen became a professional comic artist and worked for a number of major publishers including Northstar, Fantagraphics, Malibu, DC Comics and Marvel Comics. He gained attention as penciller for a four issue mini-series story for DC's Aquaman,  in collaboration with writer, Peter David. The Aquaman:Time and Tide  series was later collected into a trade paperback.

Jarvinen is also credited as the co-creator of the Marvel Comics Hulk character, Lazarus, with Peter David, and a DC Comics Green Lantern character, Torquemada, with Ron Marz.

Other published credits to the Jarvinen name include a series of Golden Books produced by Random House, under The Amazing Spider-Man name.

In 2004 as the penciller, artist for Moonstone Books' comic book adaptation of Kolchak: The Night Stalker, entitled Kolchak: Tales of the Night Stalker. Jarvinen has designed numerous action figures for the Kenner Hasbro.

Personal life
In 2001, Kirk Jarvinen married Pamela Milliron in a Las Vegas wedding ceremony, whose attendants were dressed in comic book attire as the Jack Kirby/Stan Lee character of Thor. They live in Portland, Oregon.

References

Inline citations

General references

Kirk Jarvinen at Lambiek's Comiclopedia

External links

Kirk Jarvinen's blog

Torquemada at the DCU Guide
Kirk Jarvinen at the Marvel Database Project

American people of Finnish descent
Artists from Detroit
Living people
1967 births